The Bedford Level experiment is a series of observations carried out along a  length of the Old Bedford River on the Bedford Level of the Cambridgeshire Fens in the United Kingdom, during the 19th and early 20th centuries, to measure the curvature of the Earth.

Samuel Birley Rowbotham, who conducted the first observations starting in 1838, claimed that he had proven the Earth to be flat. However, in 1870, after adjusting Rowbotham's method to avoid the effects of atmospheric refraction, Alfred Russel Wallace found a curvature consistent with a spherical Earth.

The Bedford Level 
At the point chosen for all the experiments, the river is a slow-flowing drainage canal running in an uninterrupted straight line for a  stretch to the north-east of the village of Welney. This makes it an ideal location to directly measure the curvature of the Earth, as Rowbotham wrote in Zetetic Astronomy:

Experiments 

The first experiment at this site was conducted by Rowbotham in the summer of 1838. He published this observation using the pseudonym Parallax in 1849 and subsequently expanded it into a book Earth Not a Globe published in 1865.

Rowbotham repeated his experiments several times over the years, but his claims received little attention until, in 1870, a supporter by the name of John Hampden offered a wager that he could show, by repeating Rowbotham's experiment, that the Earth was flat. The naturalist and qualified surveyor Alfred Russel Wallace accepted the wager. Wallace, by virtue of his surveyor's training and knowledge of physics, avoided the errors of the preceding experiments and won the bet.
The crucial steps were:
 To add a pole in the middle that could be used to see the "bump" caused by the curvature of the Earth between the two end points.
Despite Hampden initially refusing to accept the demonstration, Wallace was awarded the bet by the referee, John Henry Walsh, editor of The Field sports magazine.
Hampden subsequently published a pamphlet alleging that Wallace had cheated and sued for his money. Several protracted court cases ensued, with the result that Hampden was imprisoned for threatening to kill Wallace and for libel.
The same court ruled that the wager had been invalid because Hampden retracted the bet and required that Wallace return the money to Hampden.
Wallace, who had been unaware of Rowbotham's earlier experiments, was criticized by his peers for "his 'injudicious' involvement in a bet to 'decide' the most fundamental and established of scientific facts".

In 1901, Henry Yule Oldham, a reader in geography at King's College, Cambridge, reproduced Wallace's results using three poles fixed at equal height above water level. When viewed through a theodolite, the middle pole was found to be almost  higher than the poles at each end.  This version of the experiment was taught in schools in England until photographs of the Earth from space became available, and it remains in the syllabus for the Indian Certificate of Secondary Education for 2023.

Lady Blount published the pictures far and wide.

These controversies became a regular feature in the English Mechanic magazine in 1904–05, which published Blount's photo and reported two experiments in 1905 that showed the opposite results. One of these, by Clement Stratton on the Ashby Canal, showed a dip on a sight-line only above the surface.

Refraction

Atmospheric refraction can produce the results noted by Rowbotham and Blount. Because the density of air in the Earth's atmosphere decreases with height above the Earth's surface, all light rays travelling nearly horizontally bend downward, so that the line of sight is a curve.  This phenomenon is routinely accounted for in levelling and celestial navigation.

If the measurement is close enough to the surface, this downward curve may match the mean curvature of the Earth's surface. In this case, the two effects of assumed curvature and refraction could cancel each other out, and the Earth will then appear flat in optical experiments.

This would have been aided, on each occasion, by a temperature inversion in the atmosphere with temperature increasing with altitude above the canal, similar to the phenomenon of the superior image mirage. Temperature inversions like this are common. An increase in air temperature or lapse rate of 0.11 Celsius degrees per metre of altitude would create an illusion of a flat canal, and all optical measurements made near ground level would be consistent with a completely flat surface. If the lapse rate were higher than this (temperature increasing with height at a greater rate), all optical observations would be consistent with a concave surface, a "bowl-shaped Earth". Under average conditions, optical measurements are consistent with a spherical Earth approximately 15% less curved than in reality. Repetition of the atmospheric conditions required for each of the many observations is not unlikely, and warm days over still water can produce favourable conditions.

Similar experiments conducted elsewhere
On 25 July 1896, Ulysses Grant Morrow, a newspaper editor, conducted a similar experiment on the Old Illinois Drainage Canal, Summit, Illinois. The findings were dismissed by critics as the result of atmospheric refraction.

See also
History of geodesy

References

History of geography
History of Earth science
Earth sciences
Physics experiments
Flat Earth
Geodesy
History of measurement